The Sant Feliu de Guíxols to Girona Railway was a  gauge railway line that operated over  of track between Girona and Sant Feliu de Guíxols, in Catalonia, Spain. The railway had 6 steam locomotives of the 0-6-2T type, 21 passenger cars and 106 freight cars. 

In 1924, a freight-only branch was constructed linking the terminus in Sant Feliù de Guíxols with the town's commercial port.

By the 1960s the line was struggling financially, and in 1963 it was taken over by the state-owned Ferrocarriles de Vía Estrecha (FEVE). They had plans to convert it to metre gauge and link it to the Olot–Girona railway, but nothing came of this and it was closed in 1969. It has since been converted into a greenway linking Sant Feliu de Guíxols and Girona.

References 

750 mm gauge railways in Spain
Railway lines in Catalonia
Transport in Gironès
Transport in Baix Empordà